Ellen Ainsworth (1918 in Glenwood City, Wisconsin – 1944 in Anzio, Italy) was an officer in the United States Army during World War II. Ainsworth was awarded the Silver Star and the Purple Heart for her actions during Operation Shingle while serving with the United States Army Nurse Corps. 

She was killed during the Battle of Anzio in the 56th Evacuation Hospital, and was the only Wisconsin woman killed by enemy fire during World War II. After her death she was buried in the Sicily–Rome American Cemetery and Memorial.

Early life and education
Ainsworth was the youngest of three siblings, and grew up in Glenwood Wisconsin. She attended the Eitel Hospital School of Nursing in Minneapolis. After graduating in 1941, she joined the United States Army Nurse Corps in March 1942.

Legacy
Subsequent memorials to her include a conference room named in her honor at The Pentagon and a dispensary named in her honor at Fort Hamilton. A post office in Glenwood City, Wisconsin is designated a memorial post -office in her honor by Congress.

References

1918 births
1944 deaths
People from St. Croix County, Wisconsin
Military personnel from Wisconsin
United States Army Nurse Corps officers
Recipients of the Silver Star
Female United States Army nurses in World War II
United States Army personnel killed in World War II